Blumenthal is a German name meaning "flower dale". The English name Bloomingdale is composed of the same Germanic roots. A spelling reform in 1901 omitted the letter h in the word Thal in normal use. It may refer to:

People
 Blumenthal (surname)

Places 
 Blumenthal, the German name for Kwiatkowice, Gorzów County, Lubusz Voivodeship, Poland
 Blumenthal, Schleswig-Holstein, a municipality in Rendsburg-Eckernförde district of Schleswig-Holstein, Germany
 Blumenthal, a village in Hellenthal in North Rhine-Westphalia, Germany
 , a town in Junglinster, Luxembourg
 Blumenthal, the German name for Mașloc commune in Timiș County, Romania
 Blumenthal, Texas, a settlement in Gillespie County, Texas, United States
 Blumenthal, Saskatchewan, a Mennonite village that is now an organized hamlet in central Saskatchewan, Canada
 Blumenthal, two former Mennonite villages in the Shlachtin and Memrik Colonies, Ukraine
 Blumenthal, a Mennonite village in the "West Reserve" in Manitoba, Canada
 Blumenthal, two Mennonite villages near Ciudad Cuauhtémoc, Chihuahua, Mexico
 Blumenthal, a Mennonite village (Campo 17) in the Durango Colony, Mexico
 Blumenthal, a Mennonite village in Menno Colony, Paraguay
 Blumenthal, a Mennonite village in Fernheim Colony, Paraguay

Other
 Blumenthal Award from the American Mathematical Society
 Blumenthal Rare Book and Manuscript Library of the Judah L. Magnes Museum, Berkeley, California, United States
 Blumenthal Brothers Chocolate Company
 North Carolina Blumenthal Performing Arts Center, Charlotte, NC, United States
 21414 Blumenthal, a Main-belt Asteroid
 Blumenthal Field, North Carolina WW2 airfield
 Blumenthal Observation Tower
 Prix Blumenthal (1919–1954)
 Daniel von dem blühenden Tal (Daniel of the Flowering Valley), an Arthurian romance composed around 1220 
 Zion Blumenthal Orphanage

See also
 Blumental (disambiguation)
Bloemendaal (disambiguation)